Methanosarcina barkeri  is the most fundamental species of the genus Methanosarcina, and their properties apply generally to the genus Methanosarcina. Methanosarcina barkeri can produce methane anaerobically through different metabolic pathways. M. barkeri can subsume a variety of molecules for ATP production, including methanol, acetate, methylamines, and different forms of hydrogen and carbon dioxide. Although it is a slow developer and is sensitive to change in environmental conditions, M. barkeri is able to grow in a variety of different substrates, adding to its appeal for genetic analysis. Additionally, M. barkeri is the first organism in which the amino acid pyrrolysine was found. Furthermore, two strains of M. barkeri, M. b. Fusaro and M. b. MS have been identified to possess an F-type ATPase (unusual for archaea, but common for bacteria, mitochondria and chloroplasts) along with an A-type ATPase.

Location and structure 
The fusaro strain of M. barkeri was found in mud samples taken from Lake Fusaro, a freshwater lake near Naples. M. barkeri also lives in the rumen of cattle, where it works in tandem with other microbes to digest polymers.  Methanosarcina barkeri can also be found in sewage, landfills, and in other freshwater systems.

Morphology of Methanosarcina cells depends on growing conditions, e.g. on salt concentrations. M. barkeri shows this variable morphology: when grown in freshwater medium, these microbes grow into large, multicellular aggregates embedded in a matrix of methanochondroitin, while growing in marine environment as single, irregular cocci, only surrounded by the S-layer, but no methanochondroitin. The aggregates can grow large enough to be seen by the naked eye. Methanosarcina could produce positive Gram stain, but generally, it is Gram variable. M. barkeri has a thick cell wall compounded by a short lipid cell membrane that is similar in structure to most other methanogens. However, its cell walls do not contain peptidoglycan. M. barkeri str. fusaro has no flagellum but has potential for movement through the creation of gas vesicles. These gas vesicles have only been produced in the presence of hydrogen and carbon dioxide, likely acting as a response to a hydrogen gradient.
M. barkeris chromosome is large and circular, derived from its remarkable ability to metabolize a variety of different carbon molecules. This offers the species an advantage as though it is immotile, it can adapt to its environment depending on the energy sources available. M. barkeris circular plasmid consists of about twenty genes.

Applications and importance 
Methanosarcina barkeris unique nature as an anaerobic methanogen that ferments many carbon sources can have many implications for future biotechnology and environmental studies.
As M. barkeri is found in the rumen of cows, a place with an extreme dearth of oxygen, it is classified as an extreme anaerobe. Furthermore, the methane gas produced by cows due to M. barkeri could play a role in greenhouse gas production. However, since M. barkeri can survive in extreme conditions and produce methane, M. barkeri can be implemented in low pH ecosystems, effectively neutralizing the acidity environment, and making it more amenable for other methanogens. This, in turn, would allow people to harness the pure methane produced at landfills or through cow waste. Evidently, the implications of M. barkeri are those aligned with potential alternative energy and investment.

Notes

References

Further reading

External links
Type strain of Methanosarcina barkeri at BacDive –  the Bacterial Diversity Metadatabase

Euryarchaeota